Gustaf Håkan Jordan Ljunggren (6 March 1823 – 13 August 1905), Swedish man of letters, was born at Lund, the son of a clergyman. He was educated at Lund University, where he was professor of German (1850-1859), of aesthetics (1859-1889) and rector (1875-1885). He had been a member of the Swedish Academy for twenty years at the time of his death in 1905.

His most important work, Svenska vitterhetens häfder från Gustaf III:s död (5 vols., Lund., 1873-1895), is a comprehensive study of Swedish literature in the 19th century. His other works include: Framställning af de fornämsta esthetiska systemerna ("An exposition of the principal system of aesthetics"; 2 vols., 1856-1860); Svenska dramat until slutet af sjuttonde århundradet ("a history of the Swedish drama down to the end of the 17th century", Lund, 1864); Bellman och Fredmans epistlar: en studie (1864), and a history of the Swedish Academy in the year of its centenary (1886).

His scattered writings were collected as Smärre skrifter (3 vols., 1872-1881).

He was elected a member of the Royal Swedish Academy of Sciences in 1881.

Notes

References

1823 births
1905 deaths
Academic staff of Lund University
Members of the Swedish Academy
Members of the Royal Swedish Academy of Sciences